Daro and Matu are dialects of an Austronesian language spoken in Sarawak, Borneo.

References 

Languages of Malaysia
Melanau–Kajang languages
Endangered Austronesian languages